The Ladywell School, in Duke Street, Glasgow, Scotland, was a school for pupils between 12 and 16 who had learning difficulties. It was housed in the Alexander's School building from the 1970s until the early 1990s. Anne Bombelli was the last head teacher. It has moved to 12a Victoria Park Road South, Scotstoun.

External links

Secondary schools in Glasgow
Special schools in Scotland